aka Torasan and his Forget-Me-Not is a 1973 Japanese comedy film directed by Yoji Yamada. It stars Kiyoshi Atsumi as Torajirō Kuruma (Tora-san), and Ruriko Asaoka as his love interest or "Madonna". Tora-san's Forget Me Not is the eleventh entry in the popular, long-running Otoko wa Tsurai yo series.

Synopsis
When Tora-san takes a job at a dairy farm, he becomes infatuated with Lily, a singer. Tora becomes ill, and Lily plans to visit him to tell him his feelings are requited. She is fired from her job and must leave before she can visit Tora-san.

Cast
 Kiyoshi Atsumi as Torajirō
 Chieko Baisho as Sakura
 Ruriko Asaoka as Lily (Kiyoko Matsuoka)
 Tatsuo Matsumura as Kuruma Tatsuzō
 Chieko Misaki as Tsune Kuruma (Torajiro's aunt)
 Gin Maeda as Hiroshi Suwa
 Hayato Nakamura as Mitsuo Suwa
 Hisao Dazai as Boss (Umetarō Katsura)
 Junkichi Orimoto as Kurihara
 Gajirō Satō as Genkō
 Chishū Ryū as Gozen-sama

Critical appraisal
Yuji Yamada was given the Best Director prize at the Mainichi Film Awards for his work on Tora-san's Forget Me Not. Yamada, Akira Miyazaki, and Yoshitaka Asama were also awarded for Best Screenplay at the ceremony. The German-language site molodezhnaja gives Tora-san's Forget Me Not three and a half out of five stars.

Availability
Tora-san's Forget Me Not was released theatrically on August 4, 1973. In Japan, the film was released on videotape in 1995, and in DVD format in 2002 and 2008.

References

Bibliography

English

German

Japanese

External links
 Tora-san's Forget Me Not at www.tora-san.jp (official site)

1973 films
1973 comedy films
Films directed by Yoji Yamada
1970s Japanese-language films
Otoko wa Tsurai yo films
Shochiku films
Films with screenplays by Yôji Yamada
Japanese sequel films
1970s Japanese films